Wayne Larry Brown (born 14 January 1977) is an English former professional footballer who played as a goalkeeper. He is the current goalkeeping coach at Oxford United.

Career
Born in Southampton, former bricklayer Brown made a switch from Bashley to Bristol City for £40,000 in December 1992. Between 1993 and 1996 he made only 24 appearances for the Robins due to a number of injuries. Although only one of these was for the first team, a 4–1 win over Peterborough on 8 May 1994, he was awarded Man of the Match. After a brief spell with Weston-super-Mare he joined Chester City in September 1996, initially as cover for Ronnie Sinclair (who had an elbow injury and needed surgery) and then in direct competition with Neil Cutler. In a ten-season stint with the club he made 289 appearances, becoming first-choice keeper in the 1999–2000 season, the first of two seasons in which he did not miss a league match.

While at Chester he made seven appearances for the England National Game XI semi-professional side. He suffered an injury in training in December 2003 that sidelined him for the remainder of the 2003–04 season, as Chester ended the season as Football Conference champions. He enjoyed a testimonial match against former players in May 2004 and returned to the side at the start of the next season, but was deemed surplus to requirements in May 2005 and dropped back into the Conference for a season-long loan with Hereford United.

Brown was the first-choice keeper for Hereford in Conference matches (but was not allowed by Chester to play in cup games) and was an integral part of the best defence in the Conference that season, conceding just 30 goals. He became a fans' favourite, earning the nickname 'Superman'. In the 2006 Conference play-off final with just a few minutes to go in extra time, Brown sustained a head injury in a collision. With all three substitutions made it looked for a moment as if he would be unable to continue, but after several minutes he recovered and even made a good save in the dying minutes to keep Hereford 3–2 up. Hereford went on to win the match and promotion to the Football League, and Brown signed for Hereford permanently soon afterwards.

Brown was first-choice keeper at Edgar Street in Hereford's first two seasons back in the Football League, missing just 9 league matches out of a possible 92. The 2007–08 season saw him keep 17 clean sheets and concede 41 goals in the league, as Hereford gained promotion to League One. He kept a further four clean sheets in the FA Cup, most notably in the victory over Leeds United at Elland Road. This match was also his 100th competitive appearance for the club.

Brown's highlight of the season, as recognised by Graham Turner, came in the 1–0 win at Mansfield Town. In the last minute of normal time he saved Michael Boulding's penalty in front of the travelling support who celebrated as if Hereford had scored a goal, and in the last seconds of the match he made a further save to deny Jefferson Louis, rescuing Hereford again.

Despite being named Player of the Year, Brown rejected a new contract and League One football at Edgar Street and instead signed for Bury on a two-year contract. On 15 August 2009 he saved a late Dean Windass penalty to help his side secure a 1–0 win over Darlington.

In July 2010 he signed with Supersport United. On 28 July 2011 Brown returned to England, signing a one-year deal with Oxford United following a successful trial. He signed a further two-year contract with Oxford as player/goalkeeping coach in May 2012.

He also runs goalkeeping academies in Reading, Southampton and Oxfordshire.

References

External links

Wayne Brown Chester career article and interview (from 2003)

1977 births
Living people
Footballers from Southampton
English footballers
England semi-pro international footballers
Association football goalkeepers
Bristol City F.C. players
Weston-super-Mare A.F.C. players
Chester City F.C. players
Hereford United F.C. players
English Football League players
National League (English football) players
SuperSport United F.C. players
Bashley F.C. players
Oxford United F.C. players
Oxford United F.C. non-playing staff
Bury F.C. players
English expatriate footballers
Expatriate soccer players in South Africa
English expatriate sportspeople in South Africa